20 Years of Dischord is a three-disc box set compiled by Washington-based record label Dischord Records to commemorate its 20th anniversary.

Overview 
20 Years of Dischord is a concise but representative musical chronicle of the first two decades of the label originally created by Ian MacKaye and Jeff Nelson as teenagers in 1980 with the sole purpose of releasing Minor Disturbance, their band, the Teen Idles, debut EP; but that, over time, it went on to document the most part of the music coming out of the U.S. capital city's underground community, becoming highly influential.

The core of the collection are the first two discs, packaged together into a single CD case under the title Fifty Bands, which contains 50 songs, one track from each band that appeared on the label from 1980 to 2000, all of them previously released, featured in roughly chronological order, showing the musical evolution of the scene.

The third disc, an enhanced CD titled Unreleased and Rare, consists of a variety of outtakes, demos and live recordings from the Dischord vaults, also includes an early interview with MacKaye, as well as some video files of archival footage featuring performances by the Teen Idles, Untouchables, State of Alert, the Faith, Void, and Deadline. The songs that make up the disc were also released separately, as a collection, and individually, as downloadables digital audio files.

The box set includes a profusely illustrated 134-page book titled Putting DC on the Map. Introduced by MacKaye, Nelson and Henry Rollins, the booklet contains a brief historic review of the label, a profile of each of the bands featured on the compilation, and a pictorial discography.

Production and release 
Conceived by Ian MacKaye and Jeff Nelson, the 20 Years of Dischord box set was edited by Don Zientara at Inner Ear Studios in Arlington, Virginia. Chad Clark was in charge of the audio mastering at Silver Sonya Recording and Mastering, also located in Arlington. The video files on the enhanced CD were edited by Chris Mills and Guillaume Bernardeau at the studio of RHED Pixel, located outside of Washington, D.C.

Dischord Records released the collection on October 1, 2002.

14 Bonus Tracks 2000–2008 
In November 2008, 20 Years of Dischord was updated with an additional compilation titled 14 Bonus Tracks 2000–2008, featuring songs, all of them previously released, from 14 bands who have had releases on the label since 2000. Available only in MP3 format through digital download, this bonus collection has been sold separately or offered for free with the purchase of the original box set.

Track listings

Fifty Bands

Unreleased and Rare 
Enhanced CD containing additional video files.

14 Bonus Tracks 2000–2008 
Digital collection released in 2008 as an update of the original compilation.

Personnel 
These were the lineups for each of the fifty songs featured on discs 1 and 2.

The Teen Idles (1979–80)
Nathan Strejcek – vocals
Geordie Grindle – guitar
Ian MacKaye – bass
Jeff Nelson – drums
Untouchables (1979–81)
Alec MacKaye – vocals
Eddie Janney – guitar
Bert Queiroz – bass
Richard Moore – drums
State of Alert (S.O.A.) (1980–81)
Henry Garfield (later known as Henry Rollins) – vocals
Michael Hampton – guitar
Wendel Blow – bass
Simon Jacobsen – drums
Minor Threat (1980–83)
Ian MacKaye – vocals
Lyle Preslar – guitar
Brian Baker – bass
Jeff Nelson – drums
Void (1980–83)
John Weiffenbach – vocals
Jon "Bubba" Dupree – guitar
Chris Stover – bass
Sean Finnegan – drums
Youth Brigade (1980–81)
Nathan Strejcek – vocals
Tom Clinton – guitar
Bert Queiroz – bass
Danny Ingram – drums
Government Issue (1980–89)
John Stabb – vocals
John Barry – guitar
Brian Gay – bass
Mark Alberstadt – drums
Scream (1981–90)
Pete Stahl – vocals
Franz Stahl – guitar
Skeeter Thompson – bass
Kent Stax – drums
Iron Cross (1981–85)
Sab Grey – vocals
Mark Haggerty – guitar
Wendel Blow – bass
Dante Ferrando – drums
Red C (1981)
Eric Lagdameo – vocals
Pete Murray – guitar
Toni Young – bass
Tomas Squip – drums
Deadline (1981–82)
Ray Hare – vocals
Chris Caron – guitar
Terry Scanlon – bass
Brendan Canty – drums
Artificial Peace (1980–81)
Steve Polcari – vocals
Pete Murray – guitar
Rob Moss – bass
Mike Manos – drums
The Faith (1981–83)
Alec MacKaye – vocals
Michael Hampton – guitar
Eddie Janney – guitar
Chris Bald – bass
Ivor Hanson – drums
Skewbald/Grand Union (1981–82)
Ian MacKaye – vocals
Eddie Janney – guitar
John Falls – bass
Jeff Nelson – drums
Marginal Man (1982–88)
Steve Polcari – vocals
Pete Murray – guitar
Kenny Inouye – guitar
Andre Lee – bass
Mike Manos – drums
Gray Matter (1983–86, 1990–93)
Geoff Turner – vocals, guitar
Mark Haggerty – guitar
Steve Niles – bass
Dante Ferrando – drums
Rites of Spring (1984–86)
Guy Picciotto – vocals, guitar
Eddie Janney – guitar
Michael Fellows – bass
Brendan Canty – drums
Beefeater (1984–86)
Tomas Squip – vocals
Fred Smith – guitar
Dug E. Bird – bass
Kenny Craun – drums
The Snakes (1982–90)
Simon Jacobsen – vocals, guitar, bass, keyboards
Michael Hampton – vocals, drums, keyboards, guitar, bass
Dag Nasty (1985–91)
Dave Smalley – vocals
Brian Baker – guitar
Roger Marbury – bass
Colin Sears – drums
Embrace (1985–86)
Ian MacKaye – vocals
Michael Hampton – guitar
Chris Bald – bass
Ivor Hanson – drums
Soulside (1986–89)
Bobby Sullivan – vocals
Scott McCloud – guitar
Johnny Temple – bass
Alexis Fleisig – drums
Egg Hunt (1986)
Ian MacKaye – vocals, guitar, bass
Jeff Nelson – drums, backing vocals
One Last Wish (1986–87)
Guy Picciotto – vocals
Michael Hampton – guitar
Eddie Janney – bass
Brendan Canty – drums
Fire Party (1986–90)
Amy Pickering – vocals
Natalie Avery – guitar
Kate Samworth – bass
Nicky Thomas – drums
Ignition (1986–89)
Alec MacKaye – vocals
Chris Bald – guitar
Chris Thomson – bass
Dante Ferrando – drums
Three (1986–88)
Geoff Turner – vocals, guitar
Mark Haggerty – guitar
Steve Niles – bass
Jeff Nelson – drums
Shudder to Think (1986–98)
Craig Wedren – vocals
Chris Matthews – guitar
Stuart Hill – bass
Mike Russell – drums
Happy Go Licky (1987–88)
Guy Picciotto – vocals, guitar
Eddie Janney – guitar, vocals, tape loops
Michael Fellows – bass, vocals
Brendan Canty – drums

Fugazi (1987-)
Ian MacKaye – vocals, guitar
Guy Picciotto – vocals, guitar
Joe Lally – bass
Brendan Canty – drums
Lungfish (1988-)
Daniel Higgs – vocals
Asa Osborne – guitar
John Chriest – bass
Mitchell Feldstein – drums
Fidelity Jones (1988–90)
Tomas Squip Jones – vocals
Andy Charneco – guitar
Dug E. Bird – bass
Jerry Busher – drums
The Nation of Ulysses (1988–92)
Ian Svenonius – vocals, trumpet
Tim Green – guitar
Steve Kroner – guitar
Steve Gamboa – bass
James Canty – drums
Holy Rollers (1989–95)
Marc Lambiotte – vocals, guitar
Joe Aronstamn – bass, vocals
Maria Jones – drums, vocals
Ian MacKaye – additional vocals
Amy Pickering – additional vocals, tambourine
Jawbox (1989–97)
J. Robbins – vocals, guitar
Bill Barbot – guitar, vocals
Kim Coletta – bass
Zachary Barocas – drums
Severin (1989–93)
Alec Bourgeois – vocals, guitar
Mark Haggerty – guitar
Eugene Bogan – bass, bagpipes
Alex Daniels – drums
High Back Chairs (1989–93)
Peter Hayes – vocals, guitar
Jim Spellman – guitar
Charles Steck – bass
Jeff Nelson – drums
Autoclave (1990–91)
Christina Billotte – vocals, bass
Mary Timony – guitar, vocals
Nikki Chapman – guitar
Melissa Berkoff – drums
Circus Lupus (1990–93)
Chris Thomson – vocals
Chris Hamley – guitar
Seth Lorinczi – bass, additional vocals
Arika Casebolt – drums
Joan Jett – additional vocals
Amy Pickering – additional vocals
Branch Manager (1990–97)
Ron Winters – vocals, guitar
Dave Allen – bass
Derrick Decker – drums
Slant 6 (1992–95)
Christina Billotte – vocals, guitar
Myra Power – bass, vocals
Marge Marshall – drums
Hoover (1992–94)
Joseph McRedmond – guitar, vocals
Alexander T. Dunham – guitar, vocals
Frederick Erskine – bass, vocals
Christopher Farrall – drums
Trusty (1989–97)
Bobby Matthews – vocals, guitar
James Brady – guitar
Brad Long – bass
Jim Schaffer – drums
Smart Went Crazy (1993–98)
Chad Clark – vocals, guitar
Jeff Boswell – guitar
Abram Goodrich – bass
Hilary Soldati – cello
Devin Ocampo – drums
The Crownhate Ruin (1994–96)
Joseph McRedmond – vocals, guitar
Frederick Erskine – vocals, bass
Vin Novara – drums
The Warmers (1994–97)
Alec MacKaye – guitar, vocals
Juan Luis Carrera – bass, vocals
Amy Farina – drums
Make-Up (1995–2000)
Ian Svenonius – vocals
James Canty – guitar, organ
Michelle Mae –  bass
Steve Gamboa – drums
Bluetip (1995–2002)
Jason Farrell – vocals, guitar
Dave Stern – guitar
Jake Kump – bass
Dave Bryson – drums
Faraquet (1997–2001)
Devin Ocampo – guitar, vocals
Jeff Boswell – bass
Chad Molter – drums
Q and Not U (1998–2005)
Chris Richards – guitar, vocals
Harris Klahr – guitar, vocals
Matt Borlik – bass
John Davis – drums

Production (box set)
Don Zientara – editing (audio)
Guillaume Bernardeau – editing (video)
Chris Mills – editing (video)
Chad Clark – audio mastering
Jeff Nelson – graphic design, liner notes
Michaele Fussell – artwork (graphic production)
Ian MacKaye – liner notes
Henry Rollins – liner notes

Notes

References

Further reading 
 Andersen, Mark; Jenkins, Mark (Soft Skull Press, 2001). Dance of Days: Two Decades of Punk in the Nation's Capital. Fourth ed., 2009. Akashic Books. .

Articles
 Beaujon, Andrew (May 2003). "Out of Step with the World". Spin 19 (5).

External links 
20 Years of Dischord. Dischord Records.
 Heller, Jason (November 18, 2014). "Primer: Where to start with the righteous noise of Dischord Records". The A.V. Club.
 20 Years of Dischord. AllMusic.
 20 Years of Dischord. Discogs.
 20 Years of Dischord: 14 Bonus Tracks 2000–2008. Discogs.
 20 Years of Dischord . Punky Gibbon.

2002 compilation albums
Record label compilation albums